HMCS Winnipeg was an  that served in the Royal Canadian Navy during the Second World War. Used primarily as a convoy escort, the vessel served in the Battle of the Atlantic. Following the war she placed in reserve before being sold to Belgium and renamed A.F. Dufour. She served with the Belgian Navy until 1966.

Design and description
The ships' complement consisted of 85 officers and ratings.

The reciprocating ships had two vertical triple-expansion steam engines, each driving one shaft, using steam provided by two Admiralty three-drum boilers.

The Algerine class was armed with a QF  Mk V anti-aircraft gun and four twin-gun mounts for Oerlikon 20 mm cannon. The latter guns were in short supply when the first ships were being completed and they often got a proportion of single mounts. By 1944, single-barrel Bofors  mounts began replacing the twin 20 mm mounts on a one for one basis. All of the ships were fitted for four throwers and two rails for depth charges. Many Canadian ships omitted their sweeping gear in exchange for a 24-barrel Hedgehog spigot mortar and a stowage capacity for 90+ depth charges.

Service history

Royal Canadian Navy
Winnipeg was ordered on 12 December 1941. The ship was laid down on 31 January 1942 by Port Arthur Shipbuilding Company Ltd. at Port Arthur, Ontario and launched 19 September later that year. She was commissioned into the Royal Canadian Navy on 29 July 1943 at Port Arthur with the pennant number J 337.

After commissioning, Winnipeg worked up at Pictou before joining the Western Escort Force. The vessel was assigned to the convoy escort group W-7 initially, transferring to W-6 in December 1943. From February to April 1944 the ship acted as the Senior Officer's ship of the escort group. As Senior Officer Ship, the commander of the escort would be aboard her during convoy missions.

Winnipeg joined escort group W-5, becoming that group's Senior Officer's ship upon transfer and remained with that group until it was disbanded in June 1945. The ship was placed in reserve at Sydney for a short period before being reactivated and transferred to Esquimalt, British Columbia. There she was paid off into the reserve on 11 January 1946.

Belgian Navy

After lying in reserve for ten years, Winnipeg was brought back to the east coast of Canada in 1956. She was sold to Belgium and entered into service with the Belgian Navy on 7 August 1959 as A.F. Dufour. The ship was reclassified as a coastal escort after entering service. Upon acquisition, the 20 mm anti-aircraft guns were replaced with 40 mm anti-aircraft guns in single mounts. In 1960, the ship took part in Operation Camoens in the Belgian Congo. On 7 November 1966, the ship sold to M. Bakker P.V.B.A and broken up for scrap.

See also
 List of ships of the Canadian Navy

Notes

References

External links
 Haze Gray and Underway
 ReadyAyeReady.com

Algerine-class minesweepers of the Royal Canadian Navy
Ships built in Ontario
1942 ships
World War II minesweepers of Canada
World War II escort ships of Canada
Algerine-class minesweepers of the Belgian Navy